Polyalthia hypogaea is a species of plant in the family Annonaceae. It is a tree endemic to Peninsular Malaysia.

References

hypogaea
Endemic flora of Peninsular Malaysia
Trees of Peninsular Malaysia
Least concern plants
Taxonomy articles created by Polbot
Taxobox binomials not recognized by IUCN